Baja Studios, formerly Fox Baja, is an American-owned film studio near the resort community of Rosarito, Baja California, Mexico. It comprises the world's largest stages and water tanks designed for filming. As well as major film work the facility is used for making commercials, music videos, television series, and movies for television.

Originally built for Twentieth Century Fox for the reconstruction of RMS Titanic in the 1997 film Titanic, it has since then built some of the largest sets for numerous other studios including, MGMs Tomorrow Never Dies, Amblin Entertainments In Dreams, Warner Bros.s Deep Blue Sea, Phoenix Picturess Weight of Water, Disneys Pearl Harbor and Fox's Master and Commander: The Far Side of the World. The studios are near Rosarito, Baja California, Mexico.

History

Fox Baja Studios began life as a subsidiary of Twentieth Century Fox, a part of the global corporate holdings of Rupert Murdoch on land leased by the Hollywood studio.  Construction of the facility costing an estimated $20 million USD began on 6 June 1996 on land leased by the Hollywood studio next to the northern edge of a small fishing village (Puerto Popotla). The corporation had an interest in breaking the power in Hollywood of the Teamsters Union; the corporation had learned from the Wapping dispute. The studio's design was heavily influenced by the production needs of the first film to be shot there, James Cameron's epic Titanic, where there was a requirement to shoot a 775-foot-long replica of the ship in a water tank. Fox sold the studios in May 2007 to Baja Acquisitions (a consortium of "local financial interests") for an eight-figure US Dollar sum.

There was a downturn in the area from 2007 when tourism lessened due to a local drug war and a tightening of travel restrictions. Popotla had become attractive to smugglers of illegal immigrants at night once the restaurant trade had closed for the day.

In 2018 a resurgence in filmmaking for Internet streaming by Amazon, HBO, and Netflix lifted prospects for the studio.

Facilities

The studio is built alongside the ocean coastline, enabling an unobstructed view of the sea. It comprises 51 acres of land overlooking the Pacific Ocean, with 2,000 feet of coastline frontage. The facility has 5 stages, 4 indoor and outdoor water tanks, street sets, and is a self-contained facility, with offices, scenery shops, wardrobe and dressing rooms. Two of the stages and three of the tanks are combined. There are four tanks with a combined volume of over 20 million gallons fed by a filtration seawater plant capable of delivering 9,000 gallons of water per minute.

Tank 1 is an infinite horizon pond which adjoins and overlooks the Pacific.  Built to film Titanic, it is a 360,000-square-foot concrete pool with a full capacity of 17 million gallons, used for exterior shooting, wet or dry, and consists of three depth levels from 3 1/2 to 40 feet. The tank can be emptied or filled in 40 hours. Alongside it is a 162-foot motor-driven tower crane, used for constructing film sets and as a lighting and camera platform.   Fox employed mostly American technical personnel for the tank's construction, despite available Mexican resources. On completion of filming, the tank was drained of chlorinated water too quickly without management in one batch, ruining the fishing waters at Popotla.

There is a smaller outdoor tank and another two built into an indoor stage.

Studio tour
Fox created a Studio Tour named Foxploration, which opened in May 2001 consisting largely of Titanic exhibits, Fox-derived displays, and items from other films, notably Master and Commander. This tour closed.

Films

Titanic (1997)
Tomorrow Never Dies (1997) (Second Unit)
Deep Blue Sea (1999)
In Dreams (1999)
The Weight of Water (2000)
Pearl Harbor (2001)
Master and Commander: The Far Side of the World (2003)
Kung Pow! Enter the Fist (2002)
Ghosts of the Abyss (2003)
Jumper (2008)
All Is Lost (2013)
Against the Sun (2014)
Little Boy (2015)

Television

Tremors (2003)
Fear the Walking Dead (2016) • Season 2
9-1-1 (TV series)   (2019) Season 3
Selena: The Series (2020–2021) • Part 1 and Part 2

References

External links 

 

1996 establishments in Mexico
Film production companies of Mexico
Entertainment companies established in 1996
Mass media companies established in 1996
Companies based in Mexico City